Gusu District is one of five urban districts and the main district of Suzhou, Jiangsu province, China. It was created on 1 September 2012 by the merger of the three former districts of Canglang, Pingjiang, and Jinchang.

Administrative divisions
As of 2020, Gusu District has the following 8 subdistricts:

 Baiyangwan Subdistrict
 Pingjiang Subdistrict
 Jinchang Subdistrict
 Canglang Subdistrict
 Shuangta Subdistrict
 Huqiu Subdistrict
 Sujin Subdistrict
 Wumenqiao Subdistrict

Historical divisions 
As of 2011, the three districts which formed Gusu District had 17 subdistricts and 3 towns.

See also
 Guanqian Street
Pingjiang Road
Shantang Street
Tiger Hill

References

 
2012 establishments in China
Administrative divisions of Suzhou
County-level divisions of Jiangsu